Adam and the Plants are an American indie rock band from New Jersey.

History 
Adam and the Plants are a four-piece folk rock and power pop group from Montclair, New Jersey, that was formed in 2012, by singer and guitarist Adam Copeland, previously in the bands Ben Franklin, the Meltdowns and Black Water; the latter described as "irascible but big-hearted punk rock." Patch describes Adam and the Plants as "strange, funny, and heartrending [...] power-pop rock and soul," and they draw comparison to the music of the Kinks, National, the Band and Nick Cave. Copeland cites musical influence from Alex Chilton, 1970s Brian Eno, Kinoko Teikoku and Spencer Krug.

Their first album, The End of the World was self-released on compact disc and digital download, on May 1, 2015. It is described in The Jersey Journal as an "apocalyptic ten-track journey [that] features "three guitars fighting over the scraps of a rhythm" and the gentle sound of waves crashing onto the shore."

Sniffling Indie Kids 
The four-track EP Born with the Gift of Magic was released with Sniffling Indie Kids on compact disc and digital download, on January 27, 2017. It was recorded in late 2015, produced by Copeland at Pearl Studios, mixed by Skylar Adler at Skylar Ross Recording, and mastered by Alan Douches at West West Side Music. A Pirate! press release notes Copeland's "dry wit and daft cynicism[,] unique voice and knowing personality."

The record release show for Born with the Gift of Magic was held at Porta in Jersey City, New Jersey, on January 30, 2017, with Delicate Flowers and Desir Decir. A review by Jersey Beat says the arrangements are "dense and complex, both catchy and compelling." They note that the song "The Marquis" captures "Copeland stretch[ing] vocally to strike a spooky voodoo vibe that's accentuated by Naideck's tribal drumming and a incandescent guitar solo." The review closes with "you might say they're the kings of the florid frontier." Adam and the Plants performed at the North Jersey Indie Rock Festival, on September 23, 2017.

Discography 

Albums
The End of the World (2015)

EPs
Born with the Gift of Magic (2017)
Ghost (2019)

References 

Citations

Bibliography

External links 

Indie rock musical groups from New Jersey
Sniffling Indie Kids artists
Musical groups established in 2012
2012 establishments in New Jersey